Rebecca Drysdale (born 1978 or 1979 in Ohio) is an American comedian and writer who was a member of the  Second City Chicago E.T.C. cast.  She won the 2005 Breakout Performer Award at the 2005 United States Comedy Arts Festival. She performed as part of the multi-arts group performance Synesthesia. She has written for sketch comedy shows such as The Big Gay Sketch Show and Key & Peele. In 2011 she made a video for the It Gets Better Project.

Personal life
Drysdale currently lives in Los Angeles where she is openly lesbian. 

She is the younger sister of comedy writer Eric Drysdale.

Filmography

References

External links
 

1970s births
American women comedians
American television writers
Lesbian comedians
American lesbian writers
Living people
Upright Citizens Brigade Theater performers
LGBT people from Ohio
21st-century American comedians
American women television writers
21st-century American screenwriters
21st-century American women writers